Öksüzlü or Oysyuzlyu or Oysuzlu may refer to:

Aşağı Öksüzlü, Azerbaijan
Yuxarı Öksüzlü, Azerbaijan